The Prince of Providence is a non-fiction book written by Mike Stanton based on the true life of American politician Buddy Cianci.

The book is being adapted by writer David Mamet into a feature film. Michael Corrente and David O. Russell are in talks to serve as director.

References 

2003 non-fiction books
American non-fiction books
Books about American politicians